Kan Mohla is a village in the district of Gujrat, Pakistan.

References

Villages in Gujrat District

Kaan mohla is a jatt bhatti's (known as proya families) village on river Chenab side 7km from Jalalpur jattan Dist Gujrat.Famous persons from Kaan mohla is Ch Tariq Akram Numberdar.

More than 50% people of this village are shifted to Sargodha.